Route 202 is a short highway in extreme northern Missouri.  It never leaves Schuyler County.  Its northern terminus is at the Iowa state line where it continues as Iowa Highway 202; its southern terminus is at the intersection of U.S. Route 63 and U.S. Route 136 in Lancaster.

Route description

Route 202 begins at an intersection with US 63/US 136 in Lancaster, heading west on a two-lane undivided road. The road continues east past this intersection as part of US 136. From the southern terminus, the route runs through agricultural areas with some trees. Route 202 reaches Glenwood, where it becomes South Avenue and passes near residences, intersecting Route M. The route turns north onto an unnamed road, with Route AA continuing to the west. Route 202 curves to the northwest and leaves Glenwood, passing through more farmland. The road continues through more rural areas, intersecting Route F and Route Z. After the intersection with the latter, the route heads to the north. Route 202 curves northeast and passes a few homes in the community of Coatsville before coming to its northern terminus at the Iowa border, where the road continues into that state as Iowa 202.

Major intersections

References

202
Transportation in Schuyler County, Missouri